Aramis Ayala (born February 2, 1975) is an American politician and prosecutor who was the state attorney for the Ninth Judicial Circuit Court of Florida. She was elected in November 2016, and served as the chief prosecutor from 2017 to 2021. In May 2019, Ayala stated that she would not seek re-election as state attorney.

Early life and education
Ayala was born in Saginaw, Michigan, and graduated from the University of Michigan with an undergraduate degree. She then obtained her Juris Doctor degree from the University of Detroit.

Career

State attorney
Ayala announced she would not seek capital punishment in any case, causing Governor Rick Scott to reassign potential death penalty cases to another State Attorney. Ayala has filed lawsuits disputing this action in the Supreme Court of Florida, and in federal court. Ayala lost her Supreme Court case against Scott. The Supreme Court of Florida (with one dissent) ruled against Ayala, saying that the governor was within his power to take cases away from Ayala because of her position to abandon the death penalty in all cases before her and not to exercise her discretion in each individual case.

In July 2017, a video of two police officers pulling over Ayala went viral, due to allegations of racial profiling. Ayala requested the officers' information during the encounter, but did not take any legal action, writing that the stop "appears consistent with Florida law."

2022 congressional campaign
In May 2021, Ayala announced that she was running for Florida's 10th congressional district in 2022. Initially considering a run for the U.S. Senate, she decided to run for Congress after incumbent U.S. Representative Val Demings announced she would run for United States Senate in 2022 against incumbent Republican Marco Rubio. She later withdrew to run for attorney general.

References 

1975 births
20th-century African-American people
20th-century African-American women
21st-century African-American women
21st-century African-American people
21st-century American lawyers
21st-century American women lawyers
African-American lawyers
African-American women lawyers
Candidates in the 2022 United States House of Representatives elections
Florida Democrats
Living people
People from Saginaw, Michigan
State attorneys
University of Detroit Mercy alumni
University of Michigan alumni